Lonnerstadt is a municipality in the district of Erlangen-Höchstadt, in Bavaria, Germany.

References

Erlangen-Höchstadt